Joseph Bruyere or Bruyère (born 5 October 1948 in Maastricht, Netherlands) is a former Belgian cyclist.

Career 
Professional from 1970 to 1980, Joseph Bruyère, athlete of one meter 88 for 80 kilo, notably won Liège-Bastogne-Liège twice and an individual stage of the Tour de France 1972.

He is one of the specialists of the classic Het Volk, which he won in 1974, 1975 and 1980 (a shared record) and of Liège-Bastogne-Liège which he won in 1976 and 1978.

Bruyère participated in six Tours de France and achieved a victory in 1972 in the 19th stage between Auxerre and Versailles. He wore the yellow jersey twice, in 1974 for three days and in 1978 for eight days. On the 1978 edition, he finished fourth in the general classification, despite a size that was not well suited to the mountains.

From the start of his professional career, he was part of Eddy Merckx's team, until the latter retired from sport.

Team mate of Eddy Merckx 
Bruyère rode several seasons as the strongest, and most loyal lieutenants, to the super-star rider Eddy Merckx. He was known to ride on the front of the peloton for many miles, and often for much of a mountain stage until the last climb, doing the work of a whole team of domestiques.  

After Merckx retired from racing Bruyère tried to take over from Merckx as a big star, but he wasn't able to, having given his best years to the service of Merckx.

Major results

As amateur
 1968
 1st stage 4 Tour de Namur
 3rd  National Track Championship - Men's individual pursuit
1969
 1st Flèche Ardennaise
 1st Championship of the Liège province
 1st Romsée-Stavelot-Romsée
 1st Seraing-Aix-Seraing

As professional
1970
 1st Stage 3a Tour de France (TTT)
 2nd Trophée des Grimpeurs
2nd Tour du Condroz
2nd Flèche Hesbignonne
1971
 1st Prologue Tour de France (TTT)
 1st Ronde van Oost-Vlaanderen
 1st Prologue Critérium du Dauphiné Libéré (TTT)
 2nd Overall Tour de la Nouvelle France 
 5th Milan-San Remo
 7th Liège-Bastogne-Liège
1972
 Tour de France
 1st Stage 3b (TTT) & 19
1st Overall Cronostaffetta
 1st Stage 1b (ITT)
 1st Flèche rebecquoise
 3rd Leiedal Koerse
1973
 1st Stage 3b (TTT) Vuelta a España
1st Overall Cronostaffetta
 1st Stage 1c (ITT)
3rd Grand Prix de Fourmies
1974
 Tour de France
 1st Stage 6b (TTT)
 Held  for 3 days
 1st Omloop Het Volk
 1st Prologue Paris–Nice (with Eddy Merckx)
2nd GP Union Dortmund
 3rd Classica Sarda
1975
 1st Overall  Tour Méditerranéen
 1st Omloop Het Volk
1st stage 1 Setmana Catalana de Ciclisme
3rd Amstel Gold Race
 5th Milan-San Remo
8th Paris–Nice
1976
 1st Liège–Bastogne–Liège
 1st Prologue Tour de Romandie (with Eddy Merckx)
 1t Stage 22 Giro d'Italia (ITT)
1st Druivenkoers Overijse
1977
2nd Overall Setmana Catalana de Ciclisme
1st stage 1 Setmana Catalana de Ciclisme
 1st Stage 7b Tour de France (TTT)
2nd  Belgian National Road Race Championships - Road Race
3rd Tour du Condroz
4rd Paris–Nice
 10th Liège–Bastogne–Liège
1978
4th Overall Tour de France
 Held  for 8 days
 1st Liège–Bastogne–Liège
 1st Tour du Condroz
2nd Overall La Méditerranéenne
10th La Flèche Wallonne
1980
 1st Omloop Het Volk

Tour de France 
1970 - 50th
1971 - 60th
1972 - 26th; winner of 19th stage
1974 - 21st (4 days in the yellow jersey)
1978 - 4th  (8 days in the yellow jersey)

References

External links
Palmarès

1948 births
Belgian male cyclists
Sportspeople from Maastricht
Living people
Belgian Tour de France stage winners
Cyclists from Limburg (Netherlands)